Nezhilovite is a magnetoplumbite mineral discovered in 1996 by Bermanec et al., who gave it the ideal elemental formula PbZn2(Mn4+, Ti4+)2Fe8O19. It forms black magnetic crystals up to 1mm with a tabular, hexagonal outline. The mineral is optically anisotropic, bireflectant and is paramagnetic. The minerals occurs in a matrix of "pink dolomitic marble from a Precambrian metamorphic complex of gneisses, schists and marbles in the Nezhilovo area" of the Pelagonian massif.

References

Lead minerals
Zinc minerals
Manganese minerals
Titanium minerals
Iron minerals
Geology of North Macedonia
Minerals described in 1996